The 1994 Ugandan Super League was the 27th season of the official Ugandan football championship, the top-level football league of Uganda.

Overview
The 1994 Uganda Super League was contested by 14 teams and was won by SC Villa, while Bell FC, Uganda Commercial Bank and Arua Municipal Council FC were relegated.

League standings

Leading goalscorer
The top goalscorer in the 1994 season was Adolf Bora of Coffee Kakira with 21 goals.

Footnotes

External links
 Uganda - List of Champions - RSSSF (Hans Schöggl)
 Ugandan Football League Tables - League321.com

Ugandan Super League seasons
1
Uganda
Uganda